Macroglossum svetlana is a moth of the  family Sphingidae. It is known from the Maldives.

References

Macroglossum
Moths described in 2009